The Communauté de communes des Villes Sœurs (before 2017: Communauté de communes interrégionale de Bresle maritime) is a Communauté de communes located in both the Seine-Maritime department (in the Normandy region) and the Somme department (Hauts-de-France region) of north-western France. On 1 January 2017 it was expanded with 7 communes, and renamed Communauté de communes des Villes Sœurs. Its seat is Eu. Its area is 214.8 km2, and its population was 36,979 in 2018, of which 6,771 in Eu and 4,723 in Le Tréport.

Participants 
Villes Sœurs consists of the following 28 communes, of which 15 are in Seine-Maritime and 13 are in Somme:

Allenay
Ault
Baromesnil
Beauchamps
Bouvaincourt-sur-Bresle
Buigny-lès-Gamaches
Criel-sur-Mer
Dargnies
Embreville
Étalondes
Eu
Flocques
Friaucourt
Gamaches
Incheville
Longroy
Melleville
Mers-les-Bains
Le Mesnil-Réaume
Millebosc
Monchy-sur-Eu
Oust-Marest
Ponts-et-Marais
Saint-Pierre-en-Val
Saint-Quentin-la-Motte-Croix-au-Bailly
Saint-Rémy-Boscrocourt
Le Tréport
Woignarue

See also
Communes of the Seine-Maritime department
Communes of the Somme department

References

Villes Soeurs
Villes Soeurs
Villes Soeurs